Hrvatski Top Model Season 2 is the second Season of the reality documentary based on Tyra Banks' America's Next Top Model. After an absence of more than two years the show returned on October 3, 2010, with a completely new channel and Vanja Rupena as the new host. The winner will receive a contract with Talia Modelsas well as a spread in the Croatian issue of Elle Magazine.

The season was aired from October 3 to November 28, 2010. After 9 weeks, Rafaela Franić was named the winner of the second Season beating Nikolina Jurković and Andrea Katkić in the final.

Contestants
(ages stated are at start of contest)

Summaries

Call-out order

 The contestant was eliminated
 The contestant won the competition

In Episode 1, Ana was called, but this was not shown.
In Episode 2, Anđela was called, but this was not shown
Rafaela won a trip to a Philipp Plein runway show in Milan at the end of episode 5. However, it was not announced until episode 6.

Photo shoot guide
 Episode 1 photo shoot: Pin up girls (casting)
 Episode 2 photo shoot: Makeovers  
 Episode 3 photo shoot: Underwater sirens
 Episode 4 photo shoot: Moaning brides
 Episode 5 photo shoot: Seafood beauty shots
 Episode 6 photo shoot: Jumping high
 Episode 7 photo shoot: Romantic sensuality  
 Episode 8 photo shoot: Gender swap  
 Episode 9 photo shoot: Animal shoot

Judges
Vanja Rupena - famous Croatian model. She represented Croatia at Miss World 1996.
Saša Joka - fashion editor of Croatian edition of Elle Magazine
Tihana Harapin-Zalepugin - fashion manager, owner of Talia Model agency

References

External links
 Official website
 Constantin Entertainment Production Website

Croatia
2010 Croatian television seasons